Slough Borough Council is the local authority for Slough, a unitary authority in Berkshire, England. Until 1 April 1998 it was a non-metropolitan district.

Political control
Since the first election to the council in 1973 political control of the council has been held by the following parties:

Non-metropolitan district

Unitary authority

Leadership

The leaders of the council since 1997 have been:

Council elections

Non-metropolitan district elections
1973 Slough Borough Council election
1976 Slough Borough Council election
1979 Slough Borough Council election (Borough boundary changes took place but the number of seats remained the same)
1983 Slough Borough Council election (New ward boundaries)
1984 Slough Borough Council election
1986 Slough Borough Council election
1987 Slough Borough Council election
1988 Slough Borough Council election
1990 Slough Borough Council election
1991 Slough Borough Council election (Borough boundary changes took place but the number of seats remained the same)
1992 Slough Borough Council election
1994 Slough Borough Council election
1995 Slough Borough Council election (Borough boundary changes took place but the number of seats remained the same)
1996 Slough Borough Council election

Unitary authority elections
1997 Slough Borough Council election
1999 Slough Borough Council election
2000 Slough Borough Council election
2001 Slough Borough Council election
2002 Slough Borough Council election
2003 Slough Borough Council election
2004 Slough Borough Council election (New ward boundaries)
2006 Slough Borough Council election
2007 Slough Borough Council election
2008 Slough Borough Council election
2010 Slough Borough Council election
2012 Slough Borough Council election
2014 Slough Borough Council election (New ward boundaries)
2015 Slough Borough Council election
2016 Slough Borough Council election
2018 Slough Borough Council election
2019 Slough Borough Council election
2021 Slough Borough Council election
2022 Slough Borough Council election

Note: The 1997 and 2004 elections were for the whole Council. For other elections the overall total, after the election, is given in brackets.

Borough result maps

By-election results

Resignation of Mrs B. L. Lopez (Labour).

Death of M. G. Long (Conservative).

Death of Mrs Mavis L. Gallick (Britwellian).

Death of Dennis McCarthy (Labour).

Resignation of Mrs P. F. Key (Independent Langley Residents).

References

Local newspapers (1863-date) and Slough Borough Council documents at the Robert Taylor Library in Slough

External links
Slough Borough Council
The Boundary Committee for England page about Slough

 
Government and politics of Slough
Council elections in Berkshire
Unitary authority elections in England